Mary Kathleen Rose Stallard (born 28 February 1967) is an Anglican bishop serving as the current Assistant Bishop of Bangor. On 19 January 2023, she was elected to become the next Bishop of Llandaff

Early life and education
Stallard was born on 28 February 1967 in Birmingham, West Midlands, England. Her father was a vicar and mother was a scientist. She was educated at King Edward VI High School for Girls, an all-girls independent school in Birmingham. She studied theology at Selwyn College, Cambridge, graduating with a Bachelor of Arts (BA) degree in 1988. She worked as a high school religious education teacher, and completed a Postgraduate Certificate in Education (PGCE) teaching qualification with the London Institute of Education in 1990.

Ordained ministry
From 1991 to 1993, she trained for ordained ministry at The Queen's Foundation, an ecumenical theological college in Birmingham. She was ordained in the Church in Wales as a deacon in 1993. From 1993 to 1996, she served her curacy at St Matthew's Church, Newport in the Diocese of Monmouth. Next, she was incumbent at Ysbyty Cynfyn, first as deacon-in-charge (1996–1997) and then as vicar (1997–2002). She was ordained as a priest in 1997, the first year the Church in Wales ordained women to the priesthood. She was a Canon residentiary at St Asaph Cathedral from 2003 to 2011; and school chaplain at St Joseph's School, Wrexham from 2011 until 2018 and her appointment as Archdeacon. She was collated archdeacon on 6 May 2018.

Episcopal ministry
On 26 January 2022, it was announced that Stallard had been appointed Assistant Bishop of Bangor, to assist Andy John in his diocesan duties while he also serves as Archbishop of Wales; she was consecrated a bishop by John on 26 February 2022 at Bangor Cathedral. She remains Archdeacon of Bangor.

On 19 January 2023, it was announced that Stallard had been elected that day by the Electoral College of the Church in Wales at Llandaff Cathedral to become the next diocesan Bishop of Llandaff. She will legally take up her See (thereby ending her assistant bishop post and archdeaconry) as of the Sacred Synod to confirm her election; this is scheduled for April 2023.

References

1967 births
Archdeacons of Bangor
20th-century Welsh Anglican priests
Alumni of Selwyn College, Cambridge
Alumni of the Queen's Foundation
21st-century Welsh Anglican priests
Living people
People from Birmingham, West Midlands
People educated at King Edward VI High School for Girls, Birmingham
British schoolteachers